No Fly List Kids (NFLK; French: Enfants interdits de vol, EID) is a grassroots advocacy group founded in 2016 by parents of children falsely flagged on Canada's No Fly List (Passenger Protect Program).  

The NFLK's website states that their purpose is to ensure that the rights protected by the Canadian Charter of Rights and Freedoms are upheld for those affected by Canada's No Fly List.

Their mission is also to have the Canadian government implement a redress system that will be able to clear those who are falsely flagged while travelling, as reported by the Huffington Post.

History 

In 2015, a Canadian father and son were travelling from Toronto to Boston for a hockey game, when they were held up by airline security. The father, Sulemaan Ahmed, snapped a picture of the airline computer and posted it to Twitter, showing that his six-year-old son was flagged as a 'Deemed High Profile' security risk because he shared a name with someone who was on Canada's No Fly List.

Over the following weeks, others came forward with children who were similarly affected. Having seen what happened to Maher Arar and others who were tortured after being wrongfully detained, the affected families formed No Fly List Kids in the efforts to raise awareness and to find a resolution to the issue of false-positives on Canada's No Fly List.

In 2015, the families began an outreach campaign targeting every member of the House of Commons in a non-partisan effort to raise awareness of the issue and the need for a solution. Over the next 2 year, the No Fly List Kids gained 233 letters of support for Members of Parliament.  

In 2017, research conducted by two Western University students, Rayyan Kamal and Yusuf Ahmed, who are members of the No Fly List Kids group, suggested that over 100,000 Canadians may be affected by the issue of being a false positive on Canada's No Fly List. Also in 2017, No Fly List Kids members were called as witnesses to testify in the House of Commons on issues they faced with regards to the Passenger Protect Program (Canada's No Fly List). 

In 2018, the Canadian federal government allocated $81.4 million over 5 years to solve the issue of false-positives caused by the Passenger Protect Program (Canada's No Fly List). However, to start implementing changes, legislation was required. The redress system was included as a part of Bill C-59. It passed the House of Commons on June 19, 2018 and was then passed on to the Senate for additional discussion. The campaign was called one of the most successful grassroots lobbying efforts in Canadian history by Robert Fife in a 2018, CTV Power Play interview. 

In 2019, Members of the No Fly List Kids were called as witnesses to testify in Senate meetings to support the passing of Bill C-59.  
  Bill C-59 passed the Canadian Senate in the spring of 2019, and was signed into law on June 21, 2019. The former Minister of Public Safety, Ralph Goodale, stated that the redress system will be implemented in 2020. Sulemaan Ahmed shared a tweet showing that his son was flagged again even after years of advocacy prompting a response from Minister of Public Safety, Bill Blair, and Deputy Prime Minister, Chrystia Freeland. 

Currently, the No Fly List Kids organization continues to actively monitor and advise the Canadian Government on the development of the redress system and other enhancements to the Passenger Protect Program.

References 

Advocacy groups in Canada